Paradise is the second full-length album from Philadelphia's Paint It Black, which followed up the band's  debut LP from 2003, CVA. It features a more melodic hardcore sound than previous releases from the band, and was met with a slightly more positive critical reception than CVA.

Track listing
 "Election Day"  – 1:09
 "Pink Slip"  – 1:27
 "Exit Wounds"  – 1:37 mp3
 "Ghosts"  – 1:35
 "The New Brutality"  – 1:38 (featured in the video game Tony Hawk's Proving Ground)
 "Atheists in Foxholes"  – 1:41
 "Nicaragua"  – 1:33
 "Labor Day"  – 1:22
 "Burn the Hive"  – 1:29
 "Panic"  – 1:44 (featured in the video game Saints Row)
 "Angel"  – 1:22
 "The Pharmacist"  – 1:07
 "365"  – 1:40
 "Memorial Day"  – 1:39
 "View from a Headlock" – 1:56 (only on Japanese and Bandcamp versions)

Personnel
Dan Yemin – vocals, guitar
Colin McGinniss – lead guitar
Andy Nelson – bass guitar, vocals
David Wagenschutz – drums
Jason Yawn – guest vocals
J. Robbins – production, recording, mixing
Alan Douches – mastering
Kim Dumas – mastering assistance
Tim Gough – design

References

Paint It Black (band) albums
2005 albums
Jade Tree (record label) albums